Włodzimierz Bernacki (born 17 February 1960 in Proszowice) is a Polish politician. He was elected to the Senate of Poland (10th term) representing the constituency of Tarnów.

References 

1960 births
Living people
People from Proszowice
Solidarity Citizens' Committee politicians
Law and Justice politicians
Members of the Polish Sejm 2011–2015
Members of the Polish Sejm 2015–2019
Members of the Senate of Poland 2019–2023